Sanatorium Under the Sign of the Hourglass is the English title of Sanatorium Pod Klepsydrą, a novel by the Polish writer and painter Bruno Schulz, published in 1937.

Plot introduction
The novel takes the form of a collection of dreamlike, poetic short stories that reflect on the death of the narrator's father, as well as life in the modest Jewish quarter of Drohobycz, the provincial town in the Austro-Hungarian Empire where Schulz was born. The hourglass of the title  refers to the use of this object as a symbol in obituaries and death notices among the Poles.

Plot summary

In "Father's Last Escape," the concluding story of the novel, Schulz makes an explicit reference to Franz Kafka's The Metamorphosis (Schulz helped his one-time fiancee translate Kafka's The Trial into Polish, a translation for which Schulz provided an introduction). The old man's business has been liquidated and all his functions and authorities taken over by his wife or relatives. Even the pretty, young Polish maid Adela has gone and been replaced by Genya, "anemic, pale, and boneless,…and so absent-minded that she sometimes made a white sauce from old letters and invoices." Father's response is to turn himself first into wallpaper, then a piece of clothing, and finally into a big crablike insect who — unlike Kafka's passive victim — runs around the house, searching endlessly for something. His wife can catch the creature in her handkerchief sometimes, but cannot hold him. One day, however, she must have managed because Father appears at lunch, as the main course, after which he escapes the table, never to be seen again.

Film, TV or theatrical adaptations
The Hour-Glass Sanatorium, a film based on several Schulz stories.

Music inspired by this work
Sanatorium Under the Sign of the Hourglass: A Tribute to Bruno Schultz - The Cracow Klezmer Band Plays John Zorn, performed by The Cracow Klezmer Band. Composed by John Zorn. Tzadik Records TZ-7349

Works by Bruno Schulz
1937 novels
Polish novels
Novels set in Ukraine
20th-century Polish novels

de:Das Sanatorium zur Todesanzeige